Knut Magnus Enckell (9 November 1870 in Hamina – 27 November 1925 in Stockholm) was a Finnish symbolist painter. At first he painted with a subdued palette, but from 1902 onwards used increasingly bright colors. He was a leading member of the Septem group of colorist painters. In Finland, Enckell is considered to have been a very influential symbolist artist.

Biography
Knut Magnus Enckell was born on 9 November 1870 in Hamina, a small town in eastern Finland, the son of Carl Enckell, a priest, and Alexandra Enckell (born Appelberg). He was the youngest of six sons. His native language was Finland’s Swedish.

In 1889, at the age of 19, he began his artistic studies in Helsinki, at the drawing school of the Finnish Art Society, but he dropped out and continued his studies privately under Gunnar Berndtson. Naturalism was the established style during his education in Helsinki 1889–1891.

In 1891 he went to Paris for the first time, where he became a student of Jules-Joseph Lefebvre and Jean-Joseph Benjamin-Constant at the Académie Julian. There he was drawn to the Symbolist movement, and was influenced by the painter Pierre Puvis de Chavannes as well as Symbolist literature.

During a stay in Brittany he made two paintings in spare colors: Self-Portrait and Breton Woman. He was enthusiastic about the Renaissance and about the idealistic and mystical ideas of Sâr Péladan.

During his second stay in Paris in 1893, he painted The Awakening, in which he used a rigorous composition and transparent colors to suggest a spiritual atmosphere; and, through contact with the Swedish artists, Olof Sager-Nelson and Ivan Aguéli, he deepened his interest in mysticism.

It is generally believed that Enckell was a homosexual, as seems indicated in some erotic portraits which were quite uninhibited for their time, but his homosexuality has never been officially proven.  As Routledge's Who's Who in Gay and Lesbian History puts it, "His love affairs with men have not been denied. [...] Enckell's naked men and boys are openly erotic and sensual." In his own time, the sensuality of his paintings was explained away as something caused by his Swedish-speaking background.

In 1894 and 1895 Enckell traveled to Milan, Florence, Ravenna, Siena and Venice, where his inner conflicts were reflected in his art. In 1898 he taught himself fresco and tempera techniques in Florence, by studying the work of Masaccio and Fra Angelico.

The years in Italy gave his work a greater range of colors and a more optimistic foundation. In the first years of the twentieth century, under the influence of Post Impressionism, he developed a brighter, more colorful palette. An example of this is the series, The Bathers, in dark, lively colors. Together with Verner Thomé and Ellen Thesleff, Enckell founded the group Septem, in which artists who shared his beliefs came together.

1907 Enckell executed the commission for the altarpiece of Tampere Cathedral. The fresco, more than 10 meters wide and 4 meters high, shows, in subdued colors, the resurrection of people of all races. In the middle of the painting two men walk hand in hand.

From 1901 onwards Enckell spent many summers on the island of Suursaari, where he painted his "Boys on the Beach" (1910). He organised exhibitions of Finnish art in Berlin (1903) and Paris (1908), and of French and Belgian art in Helsinki (1904).

Enckell died in Stockholm in 1925. His funeral was a national event. He was buried in his native town in Finland.

Works

{{gallery
|mode=packed
|height=140
|Magnus Enckell - Boy with Skull.jpg|Boy with Skull, 1893
|Enckell, Magnus (1870-1925) - 1894 - The raising.jpg|The Awakening, 1894
|Magnus Enckell - Melancholy (1895).jpg|Melancholy, 1895
|Magnus Enckell - Fantasia.jpg|Fantasy, 1895
|Magnus Enckell - The Cult of Venus - A-2003-61 - Finnish National Gallery.jpg|The Cult of Venus, 1895
|Magnus Enckell Death's walk 1896.jpg|Death's Walk, 1896
|Magnus Enckell - Bacchant.jpg|Bacchant, 1897
|Magnus Enckell - Gethsemane - A II 796 - Finnish National Gallery.jpg|Gethsemane, 1902
|Magnus Enckell - Boys on the Beach.jpg|Boys on the Beach, 1910
|Magnus Enckell - Flowers.jpg|Flowers, 1912–1913
|Enckell, Magnus (1870-1925) - 1914 - Fauno.jpg|Awakening Faun, 1914
|Magnus Enckell - Pietà - A II 1088 - Finnish National Gallery.jpg|Pietà, 1916
|Magnus Enckell - Self-Portrait (1918).jpg|Self-Portrait, 1918
|Magnus Enckell - Young Nude Male.jpg|Young Nude Male, 1920s – the white cloth possibly painted on later
}}

See also
Golden Age of Finnish Art
Finnish art

 References 

Sources
 S. Koja, ed. Nordic Dawn Modernism's Awakening in Finland 1890–1920 [exhibition catalogue] (2005)
 Magnus Enckell 1870–1925 [exhibition catalogue, Helsinki City Art Museum] (2000)
 Magnus Enckell 1870–1925'' [exhibition catalogue, Tampere Art Museum] (1988)

External links

 Magnus Enckell 
 Enckell, Magnus at the National Gallery of Finland.
 

1870 births
1925 deaths
People from Hamina
People from Viipuri Province (Grand Duchy of Finland)
Swedish-speaking Finns
Finnish people of German descent
Gay painters
Finnish gay artists
Finnish LGBT painters
Burials in Finland
Académie Julian alumni
20th-century Finnish painters
Finnish male painters
20th-century Finnish male artists